Broadway Lofts is the oldest known highrise in San Diego. It is 99 years old.

References

External links
 Main web site

 

Residential skyscrapers in San Diego